Diane Wheatley is a Republican member of the North Carolina House of Representatives who has represented the 43rd district (including parts of Cumberland County) since 2021. Wheatley previously served on the Cumberland county school board from 1994 to 2004 and on the Cumberland county of commissioners from 2004 to 2008.

Electoral history

2022

2020

2012

Committee assignments

2021-2022 session
Appropriations Committee
Appropriations - Education
K-12 Education (Vice Chair)
Education - Universities
Environment
State Government

References

External links

Living people
1951 births
People from Montgomery County, Tennessee
People from Cumberland County, North Carolina
County commissioners in North Carolina
Republican Party members of the North Carolina House of Representatives
21st-century American politicians
21st-century American women politicians
Women state legislators in North Carolina